Raidd is a 2018 Indian Hindi-language  crime film directed by Raj Kumar Gupta. It stars Ajay Devgn, Saurabh Shukla and Ileana D'Cruz. The film is based on the real life income-tax raid conducted by the officers of Income Tax Department on Sardar Inder Singh in the 1980s which distinguished itself from others for being the longest raid in Indian history, lasting 3 days and 2 nights.

Raid was released theatrically in India on 16 March 2018. It received generally positive reviews from critics and audience. The film was a critical and commercial success and entered the 100 Crore Club in India.

Plot 
The film focuses on an lRS officer Amay Patnaik (Ajay Devgn), who has just been transferred to Lucknow as Deputy Commissioner of Income Tax, where he lives happily with his wife Malini (Ileana D'Cruz). One day, he receives an anonymous tip about black money hoarded by (Member of Parliament) Rameshwar Singh (Saurabh Shukla), the don of Sitagarh, who had evaded income tax for a long time. So, Amay and his team, after much planning, head to Sitagarh. There he and his team face opposition from Rameshwar's very hostile family, but he holds up to his ideals and integrity. He searches every nook and cranny of the house with his team to find the black money without any success. After a few hours of searching, when all hope seems lost, he receives an anonymous letter, along with a map, revealing the location of the money in the house. Amay and his team break down the walls, ceilings, staircases and old storerooms (with the help of the map) to find assets worth crores (tens of millions). MP Rameshwar, not willing to accept defeat, goads Amay into letting him leave the house.

He then meets the Chief Minister of Uttar Pradesh, who refuses any help as the Income Tax department is under the control of the Central Government and the raid is legal. The Central Finance Minister is persuaded to call Amay, but is promptly rebuffed. A relentless Rameshwar meets several MPs, politicians, senior officers and even the Prime Minister, but to no avail. He then rallies his political support and threatens to topple the state cabinet unless the Prime Minister agrees to meet him. As the raid continues for a 3rd consecutive night, the PM and Rameshwar meet. The PM calls Amay and asks him to look for other legal options; Amay agrees to comply, as long as she furnishes a signed order through fax ordering Amay and his team to stop the raid, effectively negating the request. The PM realizes that a written order pressurizing the IRS Officer to stop the raid may reach the media and the Government may be brought into disrepute. She refuses to help and sends Rameshwar away. Frustrated, Rameshwar upon exhausting his political options, tries the tack of attacking Amay's wife Malini, who narrowly escapes. On hearing this, Amay becomes furious but decides to control his anger.

Finally, on the 4th day, at noon, Rameshwar sends his henchmen to kill Amay and his team. A long battle ensues and a nearly defeated Amay is saved in the nick of time by a special police force sent in by the PM. Rameshwar is arrested and before being led away in handcuffs, he asks Amay about the identity of his informer. Amay refuses to divulge that information. It revealed that Rameshwar's youngest daughter-in-law was the informer; she and her lover wanted revenge on Rameshwar for forcing her to marry his impotent son as part of a political deal. Rameshwar is seen wondering about the informer's identity in prison while Amay gets transferred to another city, with hopes of a brighter future.

Cast 

Ajay Devgn as Amay Patnaik, IRS Deputy Commissioner of Income Tax
Saurabh Shukla as Rameshwar Singh a.k.a. "Ramji" or "Tauji"
Ileana D'Cruz as Malini Patnaik
Amit Sial as Lallan Sudhir Singh
Devas Dixit as Shashi Singh
Gayathri Iyer as Mukta Yadav
Sheeba Chaddha as Prabha Devi
Saanand Verma as Suraj Singh
Sulagna Panigrahi as Tara Singh
Geeta Agarwal as Reema
Amit Bimrot as Satish Mishra, Income Tax Inspector
Ravi Khanvilakar as Rakesh Singh
Pravin Singh Sisodia as Anubhav Singh
Pushpa Joshi as Amma ji
Saurabhi Singh as Jaya
Simran Nisha as Sushma
Prakash Bajpai as Ramu Kaka
Manju Shukla as Kaki
Udayvir Singh as Shyam Bihari Lal, Director General of Income Tax
Flora Jacob as Prime Minister
Anil Rastogi as Finance Minister Raman Kumar
R.C. Pathak as Chief Minister
Ajay Singh as IT officer

Production

Development

In August 2017, Raj Kumar Gupta made an official announcement about Ajay Devgn and Ileana D'Cruz being a part of his next film titled Raid. More than 40 theatre actors of Lucknow were selected to play various characters in the film.

Filming

The principal photography of Raid took place in Lucknow and Raebareli, and commenced in September 2017.

Background
The film is loosely based on what is purported to be the longest-running Income Tax raid in history. On 16 July 1981, IT officials raided the house of a businessman, and Congress MLA and a former member of the Rajya Sabha, Sardar Inder Singh in Kanpur, Uttar Pradesh. The morning of July 16 began quietly enough. When Alok Kumar Batabyal, deputy director (Intelligence) who headed the raids on the first day, left his house in Swaroop Nagar with a group of other officers, nobody paid the slightest attention. They recovered undeclared assets worth  in cash and gold. The raid reportedly took 18 hours and 45 people to count the notes.

Soundtrack

The music of the film is composed by Tanishk Bagchi and Amit Trivedi while lyrics are penned by Manoj Muntashir and Indraneel. The first song of the film "Sanu Ek Pal Chain" which is sung by Rahat Fateh Ali Khan was released on 12 February 2018 It is the remake of Judaai (1997)  Title Track . The second track of the film titled as "Nit Khair Manga" which is also sung by Rahat Fateh Ali Khan released on 20 February 2018. Both the songs were originally composed by Ustad Nusrat Fateh Ali Khan and recreated by Tanishk Bagchi. The album was released on 1 March 2018 by T-Series.

Reception

Box office

Critical reception
The film received generally positive reviews from critics.

Rachit Gupta of Times of India found the screenplay of the film and Saurabh Shukla's acting performance to be impressive but criticized the songs which he felt were unnecessary and only acted as a distraction. Rachit gave the film a rating of 3.5 out of 5. Saibal Chatterjee of NDTV gave it 3.5 stars out of 5 saying "Devgn's brooding presence" made the film riveting. However, in a 1.5 out of 5 star review, The Indian Express called the movie "overlong and tepid". In 4 out of 5 star review for Bollywood Hungama, Taran Adarsh wrote that the film is a nail-biting thriller which "is smart, engaging, gripping and entertaining". Sweta Kausal of Hindustan Times praised the acting performances of Ajay Devgan and Saurabh Shukla but criticized the excessive length and the repetitive nature of the screenplay and gave the film a rating of 2.5 out of 5. Rajeev Masand of News18 found the movie to be impressive in parts but was critical of its editing and the second half's screenplay which he felt was weak. Among the actors, he felt that Saurabh Shukla's performance was exceptional, and gave the film a rating of 2.5 out of 5. Actor Ajay Devgn has won Best Foreign Actor award at the 27th China Golden Rooster and Hundred Flowers Film Festival for his role in film Raid.

Awards and nominations

Sequel 

In April 2020, a sequel was announced by the production team with Ajay Devgan as the lead. The script for the sequel is under development and is also expected to be based on a true story like the first one in the franchise.

References

External links

2018 films
2010s Hindi-language films
2018 crime action films
Films shot in Lucknow
Films scored by Amit Trivedi
Films about corruption in India
Indian crime action films
Action films based on actual events
Crime films based on actual events
Indian films based on actual events
Income Tax Department of India
Films set in Lucknow
Films shot in Uttar Pradesh
Films set in the 1980s
T-Series (company) films
Films with screenplays by Ritesh Shah
Cultural depictions of Indira Gandhi
Films directed by Raj Kumar Gupta